Shin Ki-Joon (born July 27, 2001) is a South Korean actor. He acted in the lead role in the 2014 KBS 2TV's children's series Magic Hanja.

Filmography

Television series

Films

References

External links 
 

2001 births
Living people
South Korean male television actors
South Korean male film actors
South Korean male child actors
21st-century South Korean male actors